The 2017 Rose of Tralee was the 58th edition of the annual Irish international festival held on 21–22 August 2017. The competition was televised live on RTÉ television. 65 women from all over the world took part during the Rose of Tralee festival with 32 going on to the live shows.
This was the first year that there is a Hong Kong Rose in the competition.

The competition was won by the Offaly rose, 24-year-old Jennifer Byrne who is a junior doctor.	
It was the first time that an Offaly rose had won the crown. Thomas Lynch was announced as the Rose Escort of the year.

An average audience of 637,000 watched the final on RTÉ One on 22 August, an increase from the 618,000 in 2016.

References

External links
Official Site

Rose of Tralee
Rose of Tralee
Rose of Tralee